The  is the cheerleading club of Waseda University in Japan. It cheers for the sports clubs of Waseda University.

Organization 

The university band is made up of three parts - leader, brass band and cheerleaders. The name of the team is "Big Bears". University authorities lend the university flags to the club to be hoisted only by the members. Only the members can lead students in singing the university anthem at an official event.

The club belongs to The Tokyo Big6 cheering party league.

Alumnae association 

The club's alumnae association is Waseda University Cheerleading Club Alumni Association（　Ōenbu Tōmonkai. Their motto is: “Strong roots for a Beautiful flower”. It is about the importance of practice and that the members must work in the background and must never be a hero.

History

The club's first appearance featured Shinkei Yoshioka at the Waseda - Keio baseball match in 1905. The club broke up and reformed repeatedly. The official origin is marked as 1940.

See also
Fight song

References

Further reading

External links
 Waseda University Cheerleading Club Alumni Association 
 Tōmon News - Alumni Association Weblog 

Waseda University